is a city located in central Shizuoka Prefecture, Japan. ,  the city had an estimated population of 139,578 in 57,593 households, and a population density of 2000 persons per km2. Yaizu is a noted port for commercial fishing.

Geography
Yaizu is located in central Shizuoka Prefecture, on a heavily indented coastline of Suruga Bay, facing the Pacific Ocean. The climate, tempered by the warm Kuroshio Current offshore is maritime temperature, with hot, humid summers and short cool winters.

Surrounding municipalities
Shizuoka Prefecture
Suruga-ku, Shizuoka
Shimada
Fujieda
Yoshida

Demographics
Per Japanese census data, the population of Yaizu has been increasing over the past 70 years.

Climate
The city has a climate characterized by hot and humid summers, and relatively mild winters (Köppen climate classification Cfa).  The average annual temperature in Yaizu is 16.3 °C. The average annual rainfall is 2176 mm with September as the wettest month. The temperatures are highest on average in August, at around 27.0 °C, and lowest in January, at around 6.3 °C.

History
Yaizu is an ancient settlement, with Yaizu Shrine claiming to have been founded in the 5th century during the Kofun period, and numerous kofun tumuli are found within the city limits. During the Edo period, Yaizu developed as a port under Tanaka Domain, and fish from Yaizu was frequently supplied to the retired shōgun Tokugawa Ieyasu at nearby Sunpu Castle. In the October 1, 1886, establishment of the modern municipalities system after the Meiji Restoration, Yaizu Village was established within Mashizu District, Shizuoka prefecture. Mashizu District merged into neighboring Shida District in 1896. The following year, in 1897, author Lafcadio Hearn began his residence in Yaizu.

Yaizu was elevated to town status on June 28, 1901. Yaizu Fishing Cooperative was established in 1903, and started to take frozen catch from Yaizu to Tokyo's Tsukiji fish market from 1908. Shipbuilding facilities, primarily for the production of fishing vessels, was established in 1924. The Yaizu Fishing Cooperative began the first wireless communication with its fishing fleet in Japan in 1925, but overfishing soon led to collapse of bonito stocks in 1926, resulting in a five-year fishing moratorium. After the start of World War II, the Yaizu fishing industry was again hit hard by the requisition of entire Yaizu fishing fleet (113 vessels) and crewmen by Imperial Japanese Navy in 1941. Only 10 vessels survived the war.

Yaizu was elevated to city status on March 1, 1951. On November 1, 1953, Toyota Village merged into Yaizu City. The city name gained international prominence over the Daigo Fukuryū Maru Incident, in which a Yaizu-based fishing vessel was irradiated by atomic testing at Bikini Atoll on March 1, 1954. The city further expanded on January 1, 1955, by annexation of the neighboring villages of Higashi Mashizu, Kogawa, Ōtomi, and Wada, and on April 1, 1957, when Hirohata Village was divided between Yaizu and Fujieda cities. Yaizu port underwent a major expansion in March 1968. The city was the site of the 2001 Japan Airlines mid-air incident on January 31, 2001.

On November 1, 2008, the town of Ōigawa (from Shida District) was merged into Yaizu.

Government
Atami has a mayor-council form of government with a directly elected mayor and a unicameral city legislature of 21 members. The city contributes three members to the Shizuoka Prefectural Assembly.

Economy
The economy of Yaizu is dominated by the commercial fishing industry. Yaizu Port was first in Japan in terms of tonnage of bonito and tuna in 2002, and third in terms of mackerel. Local industries are centered on food processing, including the production of katsuobushi, shiokara, tsukudani, and kamaboko (especially narutomaki). Agricultural products include green tea, melons, tangerines, and tomatoes. Yaizu is also the home of the Hasegawa plastic model kit manufacturing company. Yaizu is also home to one of Sapporo Brewery's Largest factories, as well as the company's new product development division.

Transportation

Railway
 Central Japan Railway Company - Tōkaidō Main Line 
  -

Highways
  Tōmei Expressway

Education
 Shizuoka University of Welfare
Yaizu has 13 public elementary schools and ten public middle schools operated by the city government and three public high schools operated by the Shizuoka Prefectural Board of Education. The city also has one private high school. The prefectural also operates as fisheries vocational school in Yaizu.

Military facilities

Shizuhama Air Base

Sister city relations

Notable people from Yaizu
 Midorifuji Kazunari, sumo wrestler
 Itsuko Hasegawa, architect
 Tetsuya Ishida, artist
 Yoshikiyo Kuboyama, professional soccer player
 Tomohiro Matsunaga, Olympic silver-medalist wrestler
 Taisuke Muramatsu, professional soccer player
 Katayama Shinji, sumo wrestler
 Masaharu Suzuki, professional soccer player
 Kitayama Junyu, buddhist philosopher

References

External links

  
 Yaizu City official website 
 

 
Cities in Shizuoka Prefecture
Populated coastal places in Japan
Port settlements in Japan